Nizhny Mangirtuy (Doodo Mangirta) is a rural locality (a selo) in Bichursky District, Republic of Buryatia, Russia. The population was 154 as of 2010. There is 1 street.

Geography 
Nizhny Mangirtuy is located 40 km northwest of Bichura (the district's administrative centre) by road. Verkhny Mangirtuy is the nearest rural locality.

References 

Rural localities in Bichursky District